Ezhuthu Kalari, a Malayalam term refers to the old traditional  village schools in Kerala. These institutions were the major centers for initiating  elementary education. Most of the children in the past had to attend these centres for learning  3Rs .  It had been known by other names as well , such as  Ezhuthu pally  or Asan Kalari or Pallikkoodam. Ezhuthu Kalari were  believed to be evolved from the ancient  traditions of Gurukula system of schooling . Teachers  of these schools were addressed by the name  Asan or  Ezhuthu Asan.  Ezhuthupally meaning schools on Shree Budda's period

References

School types